Zborovy is a municipality and village in Klatovy District in the Plzeň Region of the Czech Republic. It has about 100 inhabitants.

Geography
It lies in the Blatná Uplands. There are several small watercourses and ponds in the territory.

History
The first written mention of Zborovy is from 1418.

Sights
The most valuable building is the Church of Saint John the Baptist. It was first mentioned in 1384. It was originally a Romanesque rotunda, built at the turn of the 12th and 13th centuries. Baroque modifications were carried out in three stages from the 17th century until 1778.

References

External links

Villages in Klatovy District